The first season of the American television drama series Mistresses premiered on June 3, 2013 and concluded on September 9, 2013 on ABC. The series is based on the U.K. series of the same name, and was adapted by K.J. Steinberg. Mistresses stars Alyssa Milano, Jes Macallan, Rochelle Aytes and Yunjin Kim as the four lead characters.

Storylines

Savi
As the season begins, Savi and her husband Harry are unsuccessfully trying to get pregnant, due to Harry's sperm morphology. This causes Harry to emotionally pull away from Savi, which leads her into sleeping with her co-worker Dominic. Devastated over what she had done, Savi reveals the affair to her friends. However, April is disgusted and turns her back on Savi, adding to her pain. Savi begins to avoid Dominic at work, and even goes to her boss to get off of a case she shares with him. However the plan backfires when Dom gets reassigned instead. After this, April makes up with a distraught Savi.

Shortly after, Savi discovers that she is pregnant but she is unsure who the father of the baby is. Savi decides to secretly get a paternity test to find out the real father of the baby. When Harry finds out about her pregnancy, he is initially happy, until Savi reveals to him that she had an affair with Dom. After Harry moves out, Savi informs Dom that she is pregnant, but she fully intends to fix her marriage with Harry and raise the baby with him, whether it is Dom's or not. Adding to this, when Joss finds out that Savi told only Karen and April about her affair and pregnancy, she is so hurt that she moves out.

Still hurt over his wife's betrayal, Harry informs Savi that if the baby isn't his, he will be asking for a divorce. Due to this, Savi decides to hide the paternity test when she receives the results in the mail. However, when Savi and Joss patch up their relationship, Savi entrusts Joss with holding on to the paternity test results. With Harry out of the house, Savi begins to rely on Dominic, and the two begin to get closer. Unbeknownst to Savi, Harry steals the test results from Joss and discovers that the father of Savi's baby is indeed Dominic.

When Joss takes Savi away to Palm Springs for her birthday, Savi decides that whoever the father is, that is the person she should be with. So, as she heads back to L.A. to retrieve the envelope, she gets into a car accident. Savi and her unborn baby survive the accident, only to discover that even though Harry knows that Dom's the father, he still wants to be with Savi and help her raise the baby. When Dom learns that he is the father, he fully intends to win Savi over. Unfortunately, before Savi can answer who she really wants to be with, she falls unconscious and begins coding.

Karen
After her patient, Thomas Grey, reveals that he is dying of lung cancer and that he has been in love with her for a year, Karen begins having an affair with him. To help him end his life when the pain becomes too much, Karen prescribes Thomas fatal doses of morphine, which his wife, Elizabeth, helps to administrate. The insurance company begins to investigate Thomas' death, going so far as to approach Karen for the notes from her sessions with Thomas. However, Karen had destroyed anything relating to Thomas being her patient.

While grieving his father's death, Thomas' son Sam turns to Karen for advice as he has discovered that his father was having an affair. Even though Savi advises Karen to cut all ties with the Grey Family, Karen begins helping Sam. Things take a dangerous turn after Sam falls in love with Karen and begins stalking her.

When the insurance company gets even closer to the truth in their investigation, Elizabeth asks Karen to forge notes stating that Thomas was suicidal. Unbeknownst to Karen, Elizabeth is setting her up in an attempt to ruin her career and reputation to exact revenge for sleeping with her husband. When Elizabeth uses the falsified notes to sue Karen for the wrongful death of Thomas, Sam steps in and hires an attorney to help Karen in the suit. He even agrees to provide an alibi for Karen for the night of Thomas' death, which leads to the two having sex. During the deposition for the suit, Sam turns on Karen and decides to be his mother's alibi instead.  Even after being brutally honest, the suit against Karen is dismissed. However, the State Licensing Board suspends her license for six months, because Karen's co-worker Jacob had alerted them to Karen's affair with her patient. 

Angered over the dismissal of her suit against Karen, Elizabeth decided the only way to get revenge is to hold Karen at gunpoint and have her kill herself the same way Thomas died. However, when Sam realizes what his mother is up to, he races over to Karen's to save her. After a tussle between Elizabeth, Karen and Sam, someone is shot.

April
April is the single mother of a young daughter, who has been widowed three years prior after her husband Paul, went missing in a boat accident. At the advice of her friends, she decides to jump back in the dating pool with a single father, Richard. However, things become complicated when Paul's mistress Miranda, shows up with the child she had with April's husband, and begins blackmailing April for money.

After working out a payment plan to satisfy Miranda, April attempts to move on with her life, only for it to be rocked again with the revelation that her thought-to-be-dead husband is actually alive. When April confronts Paul, he informs her that the reason he faked his death was because he had lost his job and that the insurance money from his death would leave April with some money. Paul had been living with Miranda the whole time, and Miranda had been  keeping tabs on April's finances in order to blackmail her.

Paul's return causes Miranda to stop blackmailing April, and move back to Florida. April demands that Paul go with her, but he decides to stay so he can patch things up with April and so he can see their daughter, Lucy. When Richard finds out about Paul's decision to stay in town, he decides to talk Paul into leaving. Things get out of control and ends with April breaking up with Richard. Shortly afterwards, Richard and April rekindle their relationship. However, after Lucy temporarily goes missing, April turns to Paul for comfort which rekindles old feelings for her not-so-late husband.

Left to choose between her relationship with Richard or rekindling her romance with Paul, April decides that she should give Paul another chance and breaks up with Richard for good. However, after receiving a phone call from Miranda begging April to have Paul call his son, April tells Paul to go back to Florida.

Joss
Joss has been having an affair with her boss, however she breaks it off with him after he tries to get more serious with her. Later, Joss meets new client Alex and strikes up a very close friendship with her. Shortly afterward, Joss finds out that her company has been bought out by Olivier, whom Joss can't seem to crack with her charm.

Unintentionally, Joss convinces Alex to break up with her long-term girlfriend, Sally. This causes both Alex and Joss to get even closer, culminating in the two engaging in a friends-with-benefits relationship. Alex decides that she can't continue with this arrangement, so Joss and Alex begin dating. However, Joss finds it hard to stay away from men and cheats on Alex with her boss, Olivier. The two then break up, as they realize that Joss couldn't commit to only women.

Cast

Main cast
 Alyssa Milano as Savannah "Savi" Davis
 Yunjin Kim as Dr. Karen Kim
 Rochelle Aytes as April Malloy
 Jes Macallan as Josslyn "Joss" Carver
 Brett Tucker as Harry Davis
 Erik Stocklin as Sam Grey
 Jason George as Dominic Taylor

Recurring cast
 Corinne Massiah as Lucy Malloy
 Cameron Bender as Richard
 Penelope Ann Miller as Elizabeth Grey
 Shannyn Sossamon as Alex
 Mike Dopud as Olivier Dubois
 Matthew Del Negro as Jacob Pollock
 Dondré T. Whitfield as Paul Malloy
 Kate Beahan as Miranda Nickleby
 Gary Dourdan as Anthony Newsome
 Stacy Barnhisel as Lila
 Tory Mussett as Sally
 Kelly Smith as Mona

Guest stars
 Ashley Newbrough as Kyra
 Tehmina Sunny as Natalie Wade
 John Schneider as Thomas Grey
 JoBeth Williams as Janet
 Mimi Kennedy as Dr. Susannah Ayers

Production
In February 2012, ABC announced that it had green-lighted Mistresses with a direct-to-series order and a planned summer 2013 airdate. Thirteen episodes have been ordered. The pilot episode was written by K.J. Steinberg and directed by Cherie Nowlan, which had previously been under consideration for a pilot order for ABC's fall 2012 schedule.

Episodes

Ratings

U.S. ratings

References

External links
 
 

01
2013 American television seasons